Diego Jaume Favaro (born 9 October 1973) is a Uruguayan football manager and former player who played as a central defender.

References

External links

1973 births
Living people
Footballers from Montevideo
Uruguayan footballers
Association football defenders
Huracán Buceo players
C.A. Bella Vista players
Defensor Sporting players
Club Nacional de Football players
La Liga players
Segunda División players
CD Numancia players
Hércules CF players
Uruguayan expatriate footballers
Uruguayan expatriate sportspeople in Spain
Expatriate footballers in Spain
Uruguayan football managers
Uruguayan Primera División managers
C.A. Rentistas managers